was a village located in Kitasaku District, Nagano Prefecture, Japan.

As of 2003, the village had an estimated population of 6,423 and a density of 329.05 persons per km². The total area was 19.52 km².

History 
May 30, 1876 The village of Shionada absorbed the village of Ichizaemonshinden in Saku District.
c. 1879 Kitasaku District government enforced. The villages of Shionada, Mimayose, Gorobēshinden, Yawata, Yomogita, Kuwayama, and Yashima belongs to Kitasaku District.
April 1, 1889 The city, town, and village status enforced.
The villages of Shionada and Mimayose merged to form the village of Nakatsu.
The villages of Yawata, Yomogita, Kuwayama and Yashima merged to form the village of Minamimimaki.
January 15, 1955 The villages of Nakatsu, Gorobēshinden and Minamimimaki merged to form the village of Asashina.
 April 1, 2005 Asashina, along with the town of Usuda (from Minamisaku District), and the town of Mochizuki (also from Kitasaku District), was merged into the expanded city of Saku.

Sightseeing 
 Shionada-shuku
 Michi-no-Eki Hotpark Asashina

External links 
 Asashina Shōkōkai 

Dissolved municipalities of Nagano Prefecture
Saku, Nagano